The term rouncey (also spelt rouncy or rounsey) was used during the Middle Ages to refer to an ordinary, all-purpose horse. They were used for riding, but could also be trained for war. It was not unknown for them to be used as pack horses. The horse, which was also referred to as runcinus, is believed to be a harrowing animal on account of its proportions found in the demesne stock listing before it became an exclusively riding animal.

Use in warfare
While the destrier is the most well-known warhorse of the Medieval era, it was the least common, and coursers were often preferred for battle.  Both were expensive, highly trained horses prized by knights and nobles, while a poorer knight, squire or man-at-arms would use a rouncey for fighting.  A wealthy knight would provide rounceys for his retinue.

Sometimes the expected nature of warfare dictated the choice of horse; when a summons to war was sent out in England in 1327, it expressly requested rounceys, for swift pursuit, rather than destriers. Small sized rounceys were also preferred by mounted archers.

See also
 Horses in the Middle Ages
 Irish Hobby
 Palfrey

References

Warfare of the Middle Ages
Warhorses
Types of horse